Brandon is an unincorporated community and census-designated place (CDP) in Madison County, Montana, United States. It is in the northwestern part of the county, at the western base of the Tobacco Root Mountains, in the valley of Mill Creek.

Brandon was first listed as a CDP prior to the 2020 census.

Demographics

References 

Census-designated places in Madison County, Montana
Census-designated places in Montana